Glenmore Lloyd Brown (1943 or 1944 – 4 October 2019), also known as "God Son" and "The Rhythm Master", was a Jamaican singer, musician, and record producer, working primarily in the genres of reggae and dub.

Biography
Born in Kingston, Brown began his musical career in the 1960s as vocalist with Sonny Bradshaw's jazz group, subsequently recording duets with Hopeton Lewis, Lloyd Robinson and Dave Barker for producers such as Duke Reid and Coxsone Dodd. In the early 1970s, he began working as a producer, initially for the Shalimar label, and recorded Augustus Pablo-influenced melodica tracks, such as 1972's "Merry Up". He also recorded for Prince Buster, Leslie Kong, and Derrick Harriott. He formed two record labels; Pantomime (or Pantomime), and South East Music, and produced tracks by U Roy, Gregory Isaacs, Big Youth, I-Roy, Prince Jazzbo, Johnny Clarke, Lloyd Parks, and Little Roy. Due to low funds, his early releases were pressed in limited runs, but since became more widely available on various compilations, such as The Way To Mount Zion (featuring material from the 1969–1976 period), and Termination Dub (featuring material recorded with King Tubby between 1973 and 1979). Although he had fewer hits in the latter half of the 1970s, he maintained his profile with hits from the likes of Wayne Jarrett and Sylford Walker.

In 2000, Small Axe and Terminal Head remixed Brown's work for a single release that included remixes of fellow reggae artist, Yabby You. In 2002, Glen Brown's single produced by Ras Kush, "We Dem A Watch", was the first release on New York's Black Redemption label.

In 2010 Brown was admitted to a New York nursing home, suffering from renal failure, diabetes, loss of vision, dementia, and a heart condition. He did not benefit greatly from sales of his recordings, limiting the treatment that he could receive. He died at the Far Rockaway Center for Rehabilitation and Nursing in New York City on 4 October 2019, at the age of 75.

Partial album discography

As musician
Glen Brown Sings, Melodica Talks (Number One Sound) (1988, Pantomime Records, PRLP444)
Glen Brown Plays Music From The East (1990, Fashion)
Mike Brooks and Glen Brown Meet Rhythm Foundation ina Sound Clash (1990, Rhythm Foundation) with Mike Brooks
Cotton Style (1990) South East – with Joseph Cotton, credited to 'Joseph Cotton and the Lord Son'

As producer
Dubble Attack: The Original Pantomime DJ Collection 1972–74 (Greensleeves)
Boat To Progress: The Original Pantomime Vocal Collection 1970–74 (Greensleeves)
Check the Winner: The Original Pantomime Instrumental Collection 1970–74  (1989, Greensleeves, GREL603), (1990, Shanachie, SH 47007)
Horny Dub (1989, Grounation)
Dub From The South East (1991, Pantomime Records, PRLP02)
Termination Dub – Glen Brown and King Tubby (1996, Blood & Fire, BAFCD015)
The Way to Mount Zion (1998, ROIR, RUSCD8215)
Rhythm Master Volume One (2004, Hot Pot, HPCD1001)
Rhythm Master Volume Two (2005, Hot Pot, HPCD1003)
Green Bay Killing (Pantomime)
Dirty Harry – Version Excursion (Hot Pot)
Ghettoman Corner – Welton Irie (Pantomime)
Lamb's Bread – Sylford Walker (Pantomime)

See also
Jammyland
Hot Pot Music
Blood and Fire (record label)
I-Roy

References

External links
Discography 

1940s births
Year of birth missing
2019 deaths
Jamaican reggae musicians
Musicians from Kingston, Jamaica
ROIR artists